Trabala is a genus of moths in the family Lasiocampidae described by Francis Walker in 1856.

Description
Palpi somewhat short and slight. Antennae with branches shorter in females than in males. Mid and hind tibia with a minute terminal pair of spurs. Forewings are broad, with rounded outer margin, where the cell is open. The stalk of veins 9 and 10 very long. Hindwings with open cell. Veins 6 and 7 arising very near the base. Accessory costal veinlets are absent.

Species
Some species of this genus are:
Trabala aethiopica (Strand, 1912) (from Congo/Eq.Guinea)
Trabala bouraq Holloway, 1987 (from Brunei)
Trabala burchardii (Dewitz, 1881) (from Angola/Cameroon/Kenya)
Trabala charon Druce, 1910 (from Central Africa)
Trabala ganesha Roepke, 1951 (from Sundaland)
Trabala garuda Roepke, 1951 (from Borneo/Sumatra)
Trabala gautama Roepke, 1951 (from Malaysia/Borneo/Sumatra)
Trabala hantu Roepke, 1951 (from Borneo/Sumatra)
Trabala irrorata Moore, 1884 (from Sundaland/Philippines)
Trabala krishna Roepke, 1951 (from Sundaland)
Trabala lambourni Bethune-Baker, 1911 (from Congo/Nigeria)
Trabala pallida (Walker, 1855) (from Sundaland/China)
Trabala prasinophena Tams, 1931 (from Congo)
Trabala rotundapex Holloway, 1976 (from Borneo)
Trabala shiva Roepke, 1951 (from Sundaland)
Trabala sulphurea (Kollar, 1848) (from India)
Trabala viridana Joicey & Talbot, 1917 (from Sumatra/Borneo/Malaysia)
Trabala vishnou (Lefèbvre, 1827) (Oriental, India to Taiwan)

References

Lasiocampidae